The Alcovy River (pronunciation: al-CO-vee) is a  tributary of the Ocmulgee River in north-central Georgia in the United States.  It is part of the watershed of the Altamaha River, which flows to the Atlantic Ocean.

Course
It defines portions of the boundary between Newton and Jasper counties. It joins the Yellow River and South River to form the Ocmulgee River at Lake Jackson, a reservoir formed by a dam on the Ocmulgee. North of I-20, the Alcovy River becomes a lowland swamp for about  before resuming the nature of a Piedmont stream. The lowland area contains an ecological rarity: the tupelo gum tree.

Fishing 
Largemouth bass, crappie, red breast, bluegill, and channel catfish inhabit the Alcovy.

See also
List of Georgia rivers

References

Columbia Gazetteer of North America entry
Georgia River Fishing

Rivers of Gwinnett County, Georgia
Rivers of Jasper County, Georgia
Rivers of Newton County, Georgia
Rivers of Georgia (U.S. state)
Rivers of Walton County, Georgia